The Battle of the Asio River took place in March of 82 BC during the context of Sulla's Second Civil War. The battle pitted the Optimates under the command of Quintus Caecilius Metellus Pius and Pompey against the Populares forces commanded by Gaius Carrinas. This battle marked the start of this phase in the civil war and resulted in an Optimate victory.

The battle

After a brutal winter, fighting commenced between the two opposing forces in the spring fighting season. The Battle for the Asio River (modern name, Esino) was the first battle of the season, taking place on the banks of the river. Fighting was bloody with the Optimate infantry advancing and successfully breaking the Populares infantry who were obliged to fall back. As this was happening, the Optimate cavalry commanded by Gnaeus Pompeius Magnus attacked the retreating Populares forces inflicting heavy casualties.

References 

82 BC
Asio River 82 BC
the Asio River (82 BC)
Asio River (82 BC)